Macbeth is a 1990 album by Slovenian avant-garde music group Laibach. It consists of music composed and performed by Laibach for a 1987 production of the William Shakespeare play  Macbeth by Wilfried Minks at Deutsches Schauspielhaus in Hamburg, Germany in 1987. It is the second Laibach album consisting of music written for a play, after their 1986 album Baptism.

Track listing
 "Preludium"
 "Agnus Dei (Acropolis)"
 "Wutach Schlucht"
 "Die Zeit"
 "Ohne Geld"
 "U.S.A."
 "10.5.1941"
 "Expectans Expectavos"
 "Coincidentia Oppositorum"
 "Wolfis"
 "Agnus Dei (Exil und Tod)"

References

1990 albums
Laibach (band) albums
Mute Records albums
Works based on Macbeth
1990 soundtrack albums